Finiels is a hamlet on the slopes of Mont Lozère. It has a small number of inhabitants and a chambre d'hote and other visitor accommodation. Finiels lies on the Robert Louis Stevenson Trail (GR 70), a popular long-distance path following approximately the route travelled by Robert Louis Stevenson in 1878 and described in his book Travels with a Donkey in the Cévennes. A 'Fete of the Myrtilles' (bilberries) is held every August.

References

Villages in Occitania (administrative region)